Algazir (also Romanized as Ālgazīr, Algazīr, and Algozīr; also known as Alakrīz) is a village in Sain Qaleh Rural District, in the Central District of Abhar County, Zanjan Province, Iran. At the 2006 census, its population was 2,095, in 413 families.

References 

Populated places in Abhar County